Angelo Mayer (born 10 September 1996) is a German footballer who plays as a left-back for TSV Rain am Lech.

Career
Mayer made his professional debut for Bayern Munich II in the 3. Liga on 20 July 2019, starting in the away match against Würzburger Kickers.

References

External links
 Profile at DFB.de
 

1996 births
Living people
People from Neuburg-Schrobenhausen
Sportspeople from Upper Bavaria
Footballers from Bavaria
German footballers
Germany youth international footballers
Association football fullbacks
TSV 1860 Munich II players
FC Bayern Munich II players
3. Liga players
Regionalliga players
TSV Rain am Lech players